The Central Philippine University Symphonic Band (Commonly referred to as CPU Symphonic Band) serves as the marching band and pep band of Central Philippine University.

Central Philippine University